Pierre-Louis Matthey (19 July 1893 – 5 March 1970) was a Swiss writer and Poet.

Biography
The French-speaking Swiss poet and writer Pierre-Louis Matthey (1893 - 1970) is considered one of the most important Swiss-French poets. His themes explore the passions and despair of adolescence, mythology and the absolute powers of art, describing a poetic journey from youth to maturity. His poems are daring in form, revealing a complex, hermetic and constantly reworked language.

References

1893 births
1970 deaths
Swiss writers